Richard L. Berkley (born Richard L. Berkowitz; June 29, 1931) is an American politician who served as the 50th mayor of Kansas City, Missouri from 1979 to 1991.

Berkley received his undergraduate degree from Harvard University and a Master's degree in Business Administration from Harvard Business School in 1957.  His family owns the Kansas City‐based "Tension Corporation" (before 2011 "Tension Envelope Corporation"), and Berkley served as treasurer in addition to serving on the company's board of directors.

He was also the city's first Jewish mayor and served longer than any other mayor in Kansas City history. Prior to taking office as mayor, he served on the city council from 1969 to 1979, and was mayor pro tem from 1971 to 1979.

During his term as mayor he led the calls for a federal investigation into the Hyatt Regency walkway collapse in 1981.  More than 700 capital improvement projects occurred during his term, including a major expansion of Bartle Hall Convention Center and revitalization of the Quality Hill neighborhood.

The Richard L. Berkley Riverfront Park on Front Street along the Missouri River near the Christopher "Kit" Bond Bridge (I-35) is named for him.

References

External links
Kansas City Star profile

1931 births
Living people
Jewish mayors of places in the United States
Missouri Republicans
Harvard Business School alumni
Mayors of Kansas City, Missouri
Missouri city council members
Presidents of the United States Conference of Mayors
Jewish American people in Missouri politics
21st-century American Jews